Allasdale is a settlement on Barra in the Outer Hebrides, Scotland. The settlement is also within the parish of Barra, and is situated on the A888 which is the island's circular main road.

History

In May 2007 Channel 4's archaeological television programme Time Team investigated some prehistoric remains that had first been partly exposed when storms in October 2005 had blown away some sand dunes. The site had been previously investigated in 2006 by a rescue survey funded by Historic Scotland.

Among the remains found were Bronze Age cist burials and plough-marks, and a hamlet of Iron Age roundhouses and a wheelhouse on a par with those at Skara Brae on the Orkney Isles. The programme featuring Allasdale was first broadcast on 20 January 2008, as part of Series 15 of Time Team.

References

External links

History
RCAHMS Canmore record
Time Team - Barra, Western Isles pages
Articles
"Time Team finds Bronze Age relics on Barra dunes" (Sunday Herald - June 2007)
"Barra find dates back to Bronze Age" (Stone Pages Archaeo News - December 2006)

Villages on Barra
2nd-millennium BC architecture in Scotland
Bronze Age sites in Scotland
Iron Age sites in Scotland
Archaeological sites in the Outer Hebrides
Former populated places in Scotland